Roshanabad Rural District is a rural district (dehestan) in the Central District of Gorgan County, Golestan Province, Iran. At the 2006 census, its population was 25,066, in 6,340 families.  The rural district has 24 villages.

References 

Rural Districts of Golestan Province
Gorgan County